Herculanus of Piegaro (died 1451) is an Italian beatus, beatified in 1860.

Born at Piegaro, he became an important Franciscan preacher.  He entered the Franciscan Convent of the Strict Observance at Sarteano. He was said to have emboldened the citizens of Lucca to resist an attack by the Florentines in 1430. He died on 28 May 1451 at Castronovo in Tuscany. His feast day is June 1.  His body is said to have remained incorrupt after his death when 5 years after his passing he was moved to a shrine in the local Franciscan church.

References

External links
 Saint of the Day, June 1: Blessed Herculanus of Piegare  at SaintPatrickDC.org
 Herculanus av Piegaro

Italian Roman Catholic saints
Italian Franciscans
1451 deaths
15th-century Christian saints
People from the Province of Perugia
Incorrupt saints
Year of birth unknown